Cable is an unincorporated community in central Wayne Township, Champaign County, Ohio, United States.  It has a post office with the ZIP code 43009.

Cable was platted in 1852 by Philander L. Cable, and named for him. The railroad was built through town in 1854. A post office called Cable has been in operation since 1868.

References

Unincorporated communities in Champaign County, Ohio
Unincorporated communities in Ohio